Riskin' It All is the fourth studio album by Danish rock band D-A-D. It was released on 10 October 1991 in Denmark by Medley Records and internationally in early 1992 by Warner Bros. The international edition includes a new rendition of the band's classic "I Won't Cut My Hair" as a bonus track.

Riskin' It All sold 450,000 copies worldwide, including 130,000 in Denmark.  In the US, the album sold 60,000 copies. As a result, Warner Bros. decided not to extend their international contract with the band.

Critical reception
Billboard's reviewer left moderately positive review on this album. As per him the "biggest" problem of Riskin' It All were "Berlitz School lyrics, which range from silly to maddeningly dopey".

Awards
At the 1992 Danish Music Awards, the album won the Best Heavy Rock Album of the Year award, and the music video for "Bad Craziness" won the Best Danish Music Video of the Year award. Furthermore, producer Nikolaj Foss won the Best Danish Producer of the Year award for Riskin' It All.

At the 1991 GAFFA Awards, the album received awards for Album of the Year, Band of the Year and Music Video of the Year ("Bad Craziness").

Track listing
All songs written by D-A-D
 "Bad Craziness"– 3:16
 "D*Law"– 3:48
 "Day of Wrong Moves"– 3:58
 "Rock 'n' Rock Radar"– 2:36
 "I Won't Cut My Hair"– 5:24 bonus on German version
 "Down That Dusty 3'rd World Road"– 4:23
 "Makin' Fun of Money"– 4:08
 "Grow or Pay"– 4:59
 "Smart Boy Can't Tell Ya'"– 3:15
 "Riskin' It All"– 2:37
 "Laugh 'n' a ½"– 3:29

Personnel
Adapted from the album's liner notes.

Disneyland After Dark
Jesper Binzer – vocals, guitar
Stig Pedersen – bass, vocals
Jacob Binzer – guitar, kazoo, piano, vocals
Peter L. Jensen – drums
Technical 
Nick Foss – producer
D-A-D – producer, cover, innersleeve
Lars Overgaard – co-producer, engineer
Anders Bonde – assistant engineer 
Thomas Breckling – assistant engineer
Chris Lord-Alge – mixing, mastering
Erwin Musper – mixing assistant
Steve Marcusson – mastering
Man Overboard – cover, innersleeve
Torleif Hoppe – cover, innersleeve
Per Kruse – cover photography

Charts

References

External links
 This album on D-A-D's official homepage

1991 albums
Albums produced by Nick Foss
D.A.D. (band) albums